Pediasia bolivarellus is a species of moth in the family Crambidae. It is found in Portugal and Spain.

References

Moths described in 1930
Crambini
Moths of Europe